Famana Quizera (born 25 April 2002) is a Bissau-Guinean professional footballer who plays as a midfielder for Liga Portugal 2 club Académico de Viseu.

Career

In 2021, Quizera was sent on loan to Portuguese club Académico de Viseu in the Liga Portugal 2, from Borussia Mönchengladbach in the German Bundesliga. On 13 September 2021, he debuted for Académico de Viseu during a 2–2 draw against Farense.

On 21 July 2022, Quizera permanently signed for Académico de Viseu in the Liga Portugal 2 for an undisclosed fee.

References

External links
 
 

2002 births
Sportspeople from Bissau
Living people
Bissau-Guinean footballers
Association football midfielders
S.L. Benfica footballers
Borussia Mönchengladbach II players
Académico de Viseu F.C. players
Regionalliga players
Liga Portugal 2 players
Bissau-Guinean expatriate footballers
Expatriate footballers in Germany
Bissau-Guinean expatriates in Germany
Expatriate footballers in Portugal
Bissau-Guinean expatriates in Portugal